Dennis Paul is an American engineer and politician. He serves as a Republican member for the 129th district of the Texas House of Representatives.

Paul was born in Houston. He attended San Jacinto College and the University of Houston, where he earned a bachelor's degree and a Master of Science in Engineering. Paul established his first business in 2002. He and his family takes part at the St. Bernadette Catholic Church.

References 

Living people
People from Houston
Politicians from Houston
American engineers
Year of birth missing (living people)
Republican Party members of the Texas House of Representatives
20th-century American engineers
21st-century American engineers
21st-century American politicians
San Jacinto College alumni
University of Houston alumni